Noor Mang (نو ر منگ, also transliterated  Noormong, Noor Mung, etc.), is a small village situated between Namli Maira and Phalkot (Dhaki Khaiter) in Abbottabad District in the Khyber Pakhtunkhwa province (formerly, the North West Frontier Province) of Pakistan. Noor Mang is located on Murree road in Namli Maira Union Council.

The majority of the people of Noor Mang belong to the Awan tribe. People are religious and are all Muslims. The total population is approximately 5,500–6,500.

Geography of the region

The valley is located at the back of Abbottabad at the foot of Nathiagali/Thandani hills. Some mountains of the valley, such as Barian, and Daka, are nearly the same height as the Nathiagali hills. The valley has beautiful pine, scrub and shrub forests, streams, waterfalls, peaks, and gorges.

Most of the area of these hilly hamlets and villages is covered with trees. Peaks are covered with evergreen trees including pine, walnut, oak, and maple trees. Herbs, shrubs, wildflowers, and thorny bushes can be seen in abundance. Goats and other livestock animals graze in pastures. Most of the people use forest wood as fuel for daily use and also for home construction.

The forests of the valley are full of wildlife including leopards, monkeys, jackals and foxes. The barking jungle cock, and rabbits, are occasionally seen.

The Dhor River consists of two main streams and their small tributaries: Bari Dhor (Bara Hotter) has its source in the Phalkot/Barangali hills; the waters of the Kutli and Jandger Bari slopes and surrounding areas flow into this stream. Choti Dhor (Namli Maira/Bagnoter) starts from the base of Nathiagali hills; the waters of western slopes of the Mira Jani hills, and of the southern slopes of Nathia hills, flow into this stream.

Tribes
The majority of people of Noor Mang belong to Awan tribe, divided into Bukayal (40%), Khunal (40%) and others (20%)(migrated from other villages now they are permanent residence of village).

Mountains of the valley

There are several high peaks and mountains in the region of the village of Noor Mang.

Dana Meerajani is a beautiful and large mountain located on the near corner of Nathiagali. There are a few villages on this mountain, including Namli Maira, Bara Maira, and Nakah Maira. Abbottabad is located at an awe-inspiring location at an altitude of 9,800 feet above sea level. Meera Jani is the major tourist attraction of this village, during both summer and winter. Due to its tremendous scenic beauty, velvet green plateaus, and wonderful climate, covered with snow it wins the admiration of nature lovers.

Daka (Noor Mang) is another beautiful mountain of the valley. It is the second highest peak, at about 6,000–7,000 feet. It is located above the village and covered with pines and deodar forests.

Administration and village life

The area is administrated by one police station (Baganoter). The whole area of forest ranges are under the administrative control of Forest Division Abbottabad Wildlife Division.  Along with other small reserves, Barian, Daka, and Dagri are located in this area. The largest forest reserve is Dagri, which starts from Dhaki Khater and ends at the boundaries of Dhagri Bangla Near (Kutli).

The whole valley is netted with car tracks, although transport is comparatively less due to the domination of local transporters. There are two main roads connecting the village with Bara Hotter and Namli Maira Road. Due to the road's long distance most people use the chairlift from Namli Maira Road to the village.

Noor Mang is covered by all GSM operators. Land line phone service is also available here and other telecommunication services are also there.

With the advent of globalization and even before it, facilities such as employment, basic infrastructure, education, water supply, and roads have generally been brought only to other villages and the surrounding area of UC Namli Maira.
 
The government schools are not functioning properly. There is a lack of basic amenities and job opportunities in Khyber Pakhtunkhwa, in addition to a lack of good roads and water supply. The population residing in rural areas is mostly agriculture based.  As a result of this, the vast of majority people move to cities, especially Punjab, in hopes of a better life.

Employment

Most of the people of this hilly area work in the banking business. Much of the younger generation is employed at Mutli Co., the army, and other occupations.

Employment is the main source of income. However, 10% of the people, mostly women and older people, are engaged in agro-pastoral activities. Land is partially owned by community. Livestock rearing, subsistence agriculture, fuel wood, fodder and water collection etc. are mostly carried out by local transportation. Wheat and maize are the commonly grown crops. The village is rain-fed but soil is fertile enough to produce above average crop yields.

Climate

The weather of the village of Noor Mang remains cool, pleasant and foggy in summers (1 May to 31 August). During the monsoon season (1 July to 16 September), rain is expected almost every day. Cold winds start to chill the weather in autumn. Winters (1 November to 28 February) are very cold and chilly. In December and January, heavy snowfall occurs at the top of village and surrounding areas. The weather remains cold in spring. The most comfortable weather is the summer season.

Populated places in Abbottabad District